Ghiță is a Romanian diminutive of Gheorghe, and may refer to:

Ghiţă Licu
Ghiță Moscu
Ghiță Mureșan

It is also a surname:

Daniel Ghiță (born 1981), Romanian kickboxer
Nicolae Ghiţă
Radu Cristian Ghiță

See also:
 Ghita of Alizarr

Romanian-language surnames